Davey Davison (born Lillian M. Davis) is a retired American actress.

She appeared in the following television series: Hazel, Route 66, Shannon, The New Breed, The Eleventh Hour, Empire, General Hospital, Perry Mason, My Three Sons, The Nurses, Mr. Novak, Slattery's People, Dr. Kildare, Gunsmoke, Rawhide, Ben Casey, Days of Our Lives, Run for Your Life, Bonanza, Premiere, The F.B.I., The Virginian, The Name of the Game, The Rookies, Mannix, The Manhunter, Cannon, Petrocelli, The Streets of San Francisco, Tales of the Unexpected, Dynasty and Insight, among others. She appeared in the films The Strangler, War Party, Marriage on the Rocks and Angel, Angel, Down We Go.

Davison was nominated for Outstanding Performance in a Supporting Role by an Actress in 1963 for The Eleventh Hour episode Of Roses and Nightingales and Other Lovely Things.

References

External links
 

Living people
20th-century American actresses
American film actresses
21st-century American women
Year of birth missing (living people)